Lonavala railway station is a railway station in Lonavala, a hill station in the state of Maharashtra in India. Lonavala station is the origin of Lonavala– Suburban Trains. 17 suburban trains operate on the Pune–Lonavala route. Lonavla is also a halt for Mumbai–Pune Express and Mail trains. The Karjat–Pune passenger train also has a halt at Lonavala. Trains traveling on the Kalyan–Pune route also halt at Lonavala. This station leads access to Lonavala town and nearby areas like Karla Caves, Bhaja Caves, Lohagad, Visapur Fort, Bhushi Dam and Bhor Ghat (Khandala Ghat). Khandala hill station is just  from Lonavla.

Infrastructure and Amenities

Indian Railways has completely redeveloped and renovated the station, introducing many passenger friendly facilities, such as selfie points, 24*7 cafeteria and lot more amenities. Lonavala Railway Station, serving Lonavala town,popular for being hill station in Maharastra, falls under Central Railways zone of Indian Railways.Lonavala is also favourite tourist hot spot, hence the need for stronger railway connectivity to serve passengers and tourists. Being one of the attractive destinations for tourists, this railway station has been redeveloped with attractive station infrastructure and advanced passenger-friendly facilities. Following are some of the salient features of Lonavala Railway station redevelopment project:

1.Around 231 solar panels have been installed at the station for tapping into environment-friendly energy consumption.

2.Two plastic bottle crushing machines have been installed at station premises.

3.One solar water cooler has been installed.

4.Three attractive selfie points have been set up for entertainment purpose.

5.One new pay and park facility had been opened at the station.

6.One rainwater harvesting system had been set up at the station which caters to the eco friendly consumption.

7.Composting plant at the station had been redeveloped for organic decomposition of waste.

8.Concourse area had been renovated by depicting karla caves and colourful lighting.

9.New 24*7 cafeteria had been opened in platform 2.

Trains

Express / Mails

 Ahmedabad–Pune Ahimsa Express
 Veraval–Pune Express
 Bhuj–Pune Express
 Pune–Jodhpur Express
 Pune–Ernakulam Express (via )
 Pune–Jaipur Superfast Express
 Pune–Bhusaval Express (via )
 Mumbai CST–Chennai Express
 Mumbai–Chennai Mail
 Latur–Mumbai Express
 Mumbai CST– Siddheshwar Express
 Hyderabad–Mumbai Express
 Mumbai–Hyderabad Hussainsagar Express
 Dadar–Chennai Egmore Express
 Mumbai–Bhubaneswar Konark Express
 Kanyakumari–Mumbai Express
 Mumbai–Bangalore Udyan Express
 Dadar Central–Puducherry Chalukya Express
 Dadar Central–Tirunelveli Chalukya Express
 Dadar–Mysore Sharavati Express
 Rajkot–Secunderabad Express
 Rajkot–Coimbatore Express
 Lokmanya Tilak Terminus–Coimbatore Express
 Jodhpur–Bangalore Express
 Ajmer–Bangalore City Garib Nawaz Express
 Ajmer–Yeswanthpur Garib Nawaz Express
 Gandhidham–Bangalore City Express
 Lokmanya Tilak Terminus–Madurai Express
 Mumbai–Nagercoil Express
 Bhavnagar Terminus–Kakinada Port Express
 Mahalaxmi Express
 Mumbai–Machilipatnam Express
 Ahmedabad–CSMT Kolhapur Express
 Bhavnagar Terminus–Kakinada Port Express
 ahemdabad-pune duronto

Passengers

 Pune–Karjat Passenger
 Mumbai CST–Pandharpur Fast Passenger
 Mumbai CST–Bijapur Fast Passenger
 Mumbai CST–Sainagar Shirdi Fast Passenger

References

External links

 Lonavla Station (wikimapia)

Pune Suburban Railway
Lonavala-Khandala
Railway stations in Pune district
Pune railway division
Buildings and structures in Lonavala-Khandala
Kalyan-Lonavala rail line